Saudi Arabia competed at the 1984 Summer Olympics in Los Angeles, United States. The nation returned to the Olympic Games after participating in the American-led boycott of the 1980 Summer Olympics. 37 competitors, all men, took part in 11 events in 5 sports.

Archery

In the first time the nation competed in archery at the Olympics, Saudi Arabia entered three men.  They only narrowly avoided being the three lowest placing competitors as Mansour Hamaid was able to score one point higher than Lhendup Tshering of Bhutan.

Men's Individual Competition:
 Mansour Hamaid – 1998 points (→ 59th place)
 Faisal al Basam – 1993 points (→ 61st place)
 Yousef Jawdat – 1716 points (→ 62nd place)

Cycling

Six cyclists represented Saudi Arabia in 1984.

Individual road race
 Abdullah Al-Shaye — did not finish (→ no ranking)
 Hassan Al-Absi — did not finish (→ no ranking)
 Ali Al-Ghazawi — did not finish (→ no ranking)
 Mohammed Al-Shanqiti — did not finish (→ no ranking)

Team time trial
 Hassan Al-Absi
 Ahmed Al-Saleh
 Mohammed Al-Shanqiti
 Rajab Moqbil

Fencing

Seven fencers represented Saudi Arabia in 1984.

Men's foil
 Majed Abdul Rahim Habib Ullah
 Khaled Fahd Al-Rasheed
 Abdullah Al-Zawayed

Men's épée
 Jamil Mohamed Bubashit
 Mohamed Ahmed Abu Ali
 Rashid Fahd Al-Rasheed

Men's team épée
 Mohamed Ahmed Abu Ali, Rashid Fahd Al-Rasheed, Jamil Mohamed Bubashit, Nassar Al-Dosari

Football

Men's Team Competition
 Preliminary Round (Group C)
 Saudi Arabia – Brazil 1 – 3
 Saudi Arabia – Morocco 0 – 1
 Saudi Arabia – West Germany 0 – 6
 Quarter Finals
 → Did not advance

Team Roster:
 ( 1.) Mohamed Al-Husain
 ( 2.) Sameija Al-Dawasare
 ( 3.) Hassen Bishy
 ( 4.) Sameer Abdulshakor
 ( 5.) Abdullah Masod
 ( 6.) Ahmad Al-Bishi
 ( 7.) Shayemsh Al-Nasisah
 ( 8.) Ahamed Bayazid
 (10.) Fahed Mosaibeeh
 (11.) Mehaisen Al-Dosari
 (12.) Salman Al-Dosari
 (13.) Mohammed Abduljawad
 (14.) Saleh Al-Dossary
 (15.) Nawaf Al-Khamees
 (16.) Omar Bakhshwein
 (21.) Abdullah Al-Deayee
 ( 9.) Majed Abdullah

Shooting

References

External links
Official Olympic Reports

Nations at the 1984 Summer Olympics
1984
1984 in Saudi Arabian sport